Bad Luck Blackie is a 1949 American animated comedy short film produced by Metro-Goldwyn-Mayer.

The Tex Avery-directed short was voted the 15th-best cartoon of all-time in a 1994 poll of 1,000 animation industry professionals, as referenced in the book The 50 Greatest Cartoons.

The title is a play on Boston Blackie, a popular radio show at the time. The cartoon marks the first appearance of Tex Avery's version of Spike the Bulldog (later renamed as Butch the Irish Dog in 1955's "Deputy Droopy"), who would later appear in Droopy cartoons in the late-1940s into the 1950s.

Synopsis
As the story begins, a small white kitten is being mercilessly tormented by a large, mean bulldog. The kitten manages to escape, and while hiding for safety behind a garbage can, she is met by a bowler hat-wearing, cigar-chomping black cat, who offers to protect the kitten (his business card reads "Black Cat — Bad Luck Company — Paths Crossed–Guaranteed Bad Luck"). The black cat demonstrates his skills by crossing the path of the rapidly approaching bulldog (to the tune of Comin' Through the Rye), who is then knocked out by a flowerpot that falls from the sky. The black cat leaves the scene after giving the kitten a whistle, to be blown in case of emergency.

The bulldog revives, and tries multiple times to attack the kitten, but every attempt is foiled in the same way: the kitten blows the whistle, the black cat crosses the bulldog's path regardless of circumstances, and the dog is pummeled by various objects falling from the sky, including a cash register, a piano, and a set of good luck horseshoes (not to mention the horse they belong to).

Eventually, the bulldog frightens the kitten into giving up the whistle, and (after a couple of false starts) he gains the upper hand on the black cat by luring him under a large paint brush, turning him white and rendering his bad luck powers useless. However, the white kitten saves the day by painting herself black and crossing the bulldog's path. The bulldog is conked by a falling anvil, and ends up swallowing the whistle, triggering a case of the hiccups, each one of which causes the whistle to go off. As a result, all manner of huge objects plummet from the sky (ranging from a kitchen sink all the way to a battleship), causing the bulldog to flee in terror. The cartoon ends with the formerly-black cat giving the kitten his bowler hat as a sign of gratitude. The kitten snickers in delight when she realizes her new purpose in life as a bad luck cat.

Reception
The Film Daily (April 8, 1949): "Jet black Blackie brought bad luck to everyone who crossed his path until he met his match in large fanged bull-dog. Blackie turns white and not with age, as they work things out. This cartoon has lots of action and laughs."

Boxoffice (Feb 5, 1949): "Very Good. Blackie, a jet black cat, befriends a white kitten being tormented by a bulldog. Every time the dog crosses Blackie's path, practically everything falls on him out of the sky, from bricks to pianos. When the dog finally removes the spell on him by painting Blackie white, the kitten goes in for black paint, and assorted articles as large as airplanes rain down on the dog. Well drawn and really funny."

Voice cast
Tex Avery and William Hanna as Spike
Patrick McGeehan as Blackie
Harry E. Lang as the kitten

Availability
VHS
Tex Avery's Screwball Classics
Laserdisc
Tex Avery's Screwball Classics
The Compleat Tex Avery
DVD
Kitty Foyle
Blu-ray
Looney Tunes Platinum Collection: Volume 2
Tex Avery Screwball Classics: Volume 1 (restored)
Streaming
Boomerang App
HBO Max

In popular culture
Several clips from Bad Luck Blackie were used by the rockabilly band The Stray Cats in the music video for their 1983 hit "Stray Cat Strut".
Marv Wolfman based the Marvel Comics character Felica Hardy / Black Cat on Bad Luck Blackie. The character debuted in The Amazing Spider-Man #194 in July 1979.

References

External links

Bad Luck Blackie on Big Cartoon DataBase

1949 films
1949 animated films
1949 short films
1940s American animated films
1940s animated short films
Films directed by Tex Avery
Metro-Goldwyn-Mayer animated short films
Superstitions
Metro-Goldwyn-Mayer short films
Films scored by Scott Bradley
Animated films about cats
Animated films about dogs
Films about superstition
Films produced by Fred Quimby
Metro-Goldwyn-Mayer cartoon studio short films
1940s English-language films